The 1918 New Year Honours were appointments by King George V to various orders and honours to reward and highlight good works by citizens of the British Empire. The appointments were published in The London Gazette and The Times in January, February and March 1918.

Military Division 
Col. Augustus Mervyn Owen Anwyl Anwyl-Passingham, Recruiting Region Cmdr.
Lt.-Col. Francis Logie Armstrong, in charge of Canadian Records
Maj. Edward George Graham Talbot Baines, York and Lancaster Reg.; Sec., Nottingham Territorial Force Association
Lt.-Col. Richard Bell-Irving, Instructor, Royal Flying Corps
Maj. Lionel Oxborrow Betts, Australian Army Medical Corps
Lt.-Col. Gerald Walker Birks, Ofc. in Charge of Canadian Y.M.C.A. Services
Capt. Archibald Campbell Black, 7th Battalion, Royal Scots; Ministry of National Service
Maj. Frederick Blakemore, Army Pay Dept.
Maj. William Henry Booth  East Kent Reg.; Deputy Assistant Director of Railway Transport, Scottish Command
Capt. Francis Stewart Evelyn Boothby, Sec., Lincoln Territorial Force Association
Maj. John Bowden, Royal Engineers, Late Superintending Engineer, Ministry of Munitions, No. 2 Area (North-West England)
Capt. Arthur Boyd, Royal Army Service Corps; General Sec., Navy and Army Canteen Board
Capt. William Burton, York and Lancaster Reg.; Member of Anglo-Russian Sub-Committee, New York, Ministry of Munitions
Maj. Charles Ernest Alfred French Somerset Butler, Earl of Carrick, Royal Army Service Corps; Adjutant-General's Dept., War Office
Capt. William Stephen Cauvin, Adjutant-General's Dept., War Office
Maj. Henry Edward Chaney, Headquarters. Training Division, Royal Flying Corps
Maj. Sir Jocelyn Brudenell, Earl of Chichester, 5th Battalion, Royal Sussex Reg.; Adjutant-General's Dept., War Office
Capt. George Clark, Royal Arty., Superintending Ofc. in Arty. Branch, War Office
Maj. Thomas Dudley Cocke, Royal Army Service Corps; Section Director, Finance Dept., Ministry of Munitions
Capt. Charles Leonard Conacher, Late in charge, Perivale Filling Factory, Ministry of Munitions
Lt.-Col. Charles Paston Crane  York and Lancaster Reg.
Maj. Francis Samuel Creswell, Park Cmdr., Royal Flying Corps
Lt.-Col. Sir Charles Cuyler  Commanding 43rd Reg.al District Recruiting Area
Lt.-Col. Richard Frederick Drury, attd. Royal Flying Corps
Lt.-Col. Earle Calder Duffin, Assistant Q.M. General, Canadian Forces
Maj. Henry Stuart Ebben, Deputy Assistant Adjutant-General, Royal Flying Corps
Col. Henry John Edwards  Commanding Ofc., No. 2 Ofc.s Cadet Battalion
Henrietta Christobel Ellis, Commandant of the Motor Transport Section, Women's Legion
Capt. Edward George Robert Fairholme, Royal Army Veterinary Corps; Chief Sec., Royal Society for the Prevention of Cruelty to Animals
Capt. Charles Stanley Fisher, Acting Solicitor for Navy and Army Canteen Board
Col. Walter Blunt Fletcher, Sec., Wiltshire Territorial Force Association
Capt. Otto Tennent Eastman Freiligrath, Royal Army Service Corps; Staff Capt., War Office
Maj. George Arthur Fulcher, Royal Arty., Deputy Assistant Director, Ordnance Dept., War Office
Capt. Henry Game, Royal Field Arty.; Design Dept., Ministry of Munitions
Lt.-Col. Jack Giffard, Royal Field Arty.; Member of Anglo-Russian Sub-Committee, New York, Ministry of Munitions
Capt. Walter Brudenell Gill, Royal Engineers, Military Intelligence Branch, War Office
Lt.-Col. Edward Shirley Godman, Dorsetshire Reg.; Assistant Provost-Marshal
Lt. Ernest Goodwin, Technical Adviser on Explosives to Trench Warfare Dept., Ministry of Munitions
Capt. Walter Herbert Lewis Goolden, Research Dept., Woolwich
Capt. Gilbert Maxwell Adair Graham. Quarter Master-General's Dept., War Office
Maj. James Alexander Green, South African Forces, Administrative Headquarters
Maj. Francis Grehan, Norfolk Reg.; Sec., Norfolk Territorial Force Association
Capt. Wilfrid Edward Hiley, Research Dept., Woolwich
Capt. Archibald Vivian Hill, Cambridgeshire Reg.; Munitions Inventions Dept.
Capt. William John Honey
Hilda Horniblow, Deputy Commandant, Military Cooking Section, Women's Legion
Maj. Cecil Harry St. Leger Howard, Recruiting Area Cmdr.
Capt. Edward Maurice Berkeley Ingram, General Staff, War Office
Arthur Godfrey James, Royal Army Service Corps; Ministry of National Service
Maj. Charles Jarrott, Inspector of Mechanical Transport, Royal Flying Corps
Maj. Harold Driver Jonas, Deputy Chief Valuer and Compensation Ofc., Directorate of Lands, Ministry of Munitions
Capt. Thomas Athol Joyce, General Staff, War Office
Lt.-Col. William Kingston, Royal Engineers, Chief Inspector of Works, War Office
Capt. John Learmont  Sec., Cumberland Territorial Force Association
Capt. James Arthur Leeming, Royal Engineers, Section Director, Trench Warfare Supply Dept., Ministry of Munitions
Maj. Hugh Bennett Lewers, Assistant Director of Medical Services, Australian Imperial Forces
Capt. Francis Vivian Lister, Trench Warfare Research Dept., Ministry of Munitions
Violet Beatrix Alice Lambton Long, Late Sec. of Women's Legion, Military Cooking Section
Lt.-Col. Cyril Douglas Hughes MacAlpine, Canadian Army Service Corps
Maj. John McAughey, Deputy Assistant Adjutant-General, Canadian Forces
The Reverend Edmond McAuliffe, Chaplain, 3rd Class, Australian Imperial Forces
The Reverend Angus MacDonald, Chaplain, 3rd Class, New Zealand Expeditionary Force
Maj. Thomas McKibbin, Deputy Assistant Director of Medical Services, New Zealand Expeditionary Force
Lt.-Col. Alexander Macmillan, Royal Garrison Arty.
Capt. John McPherson, Adjutant, New Zealand Command Depot
Capt. Henry Mansbridge, Sec., London Territorial Force Association
Lt.-Col. Alexander Gordon Maxwell, Assistant Provost-Marshal
Col. Charles Stuart Meeres, Royal Arty., Army Ordnance Corps Dept.
Capt. George Metson, Ministry of National Service
Maj. Alexander Montgomerie, Royal Newfoundland Reg.
Capt. Harold Moreland, Section Director, Trench Warfare Supply Dept., Ministry of Munitions
Capt. Arthur Lenox Napier, Yorkshire Reg.; Sec., Northumberland Territorial Force Association
Capt. Walter Elphinstone Nevill, Nairobi Defence Force
Capt. Richard William Alan, Earl of Onslow, General Staff, War Office
Capt. Charles Phipps John Ovans, King's Own Scottish Borderers; Manager, Leeds National Projectile Factory, Ministry of Munitions
Lt.-Col. Sydney Lewis Penhorwood, Director of Timber Operations, War Office
Lt.-Col. Hugh Wharton Perkins, Deputy Assistant Director of Railway Transport, Southern Command
Capt. Mansel Loudon Porter, King's Royal Rifle Corps; Sec., Berkshire Territorial Force Association
Lt.-Col. Edwin Prismall  Musketry Staff Ofc., Canadian Forces
Capt. Alan Rae-Smith, Chief Accountant to Navy and Army Canteen Board
Brevet Major John Wakefield Rainey, Army Veterinary Corps
Lt.-Col. James Albert Reeks, Commanding 45th Reg.al District Recruiting Area
Capt. Richard Gilbert Roberts, Instructor, Intelligence Corps
Lt.-Col. Alexander Fowler Roberts, Director of Arty. (Field), and Senior Embarkation Ofc.
Lt.-Col. Roddam John Roddam
Maj. Robert Francis Ruck-Keene, Royal Arty., Sec., Yorkshire (North Riding) Territorial Force Association
Edward John Russell  Technical Adviser in the Food Production Dept.; Director of the Rothamsted Experimental Station
Capt. Cecil Myles Serjeantson, Sec., Leicester and Rutland Territorial Force Association
Maj. Eric James Sexton, Commanding Australian Machine Gun Training Depot
Maj. Frederic Joseph Sharp, Remount Service
Lt.-Col. William Constable Shepherd, Commandant of Great Yarmouth
Maj. Philip George Moncrieff Skene, Late Deputy Assistant Director, Ordnance Dept., War Office; Assistant Sec., Russian Supplies Committee, Ministry of Munitions
Capt. Rowland Hill Stainforth, Deputy Controller, Controlled Establishments Branch, Ministry of Munitions
Lt.-Col. Thomas Heron Steel, Australian Overseas Training Brigade
Lt. Valentine Beardmore Stewart, Late Manager, Messrs. William Beardmore & Company, Ltd., Glasgow
Maj. John Stuart, Assistant Inspector of Recruiting
Maj. Brian Gresley Elton Sunderland, Deputy Assistant Director of Arty.
Lt.-Col. Arthur Sykes, Royal Irish Fusiliers, Inspector of Army Catering
Capt. Kenneth Symes, Late Head of Armour Plate Section, Mechanical Warfare Dept., Ministry of Munitions
Capt. John Barwick Thompson, Border Reg., Ministry of National Service
Lt.-Col. Edward Newbury Thornton, South African Forces; South African Hospital, Richmond Park
Maj. Edwin Ernest Enever Todd, Army Pay Dept.
Edith Mary Trotter, Recruiting Controller, Queen Mary's Army Auxiliary Corps
Lt.-Col. William Kington Tucker, Forage Dept., War Office
Capt. Clement Vallange, Design Dept., Ministry of Munitions
Capt. Henry Edward van den Bergh, Chief Inspector and Controller, Buying Branch, Canteen Board
Maj. Francis Peter Vidal, Army Pay Dept.
Maj. James Taylor Watson, Embarkation Staff Ofc., New Zealand Expeditionary Force
Capt. Gerald Hamilton Wicks, Trench Warfare Research Dept., Ministry of Munitions
Lt.-Col. Arthur Cecil Williams, Director of Inspection, Optical Stores, Ministry of Munitions
Capt. Charles Edward Williams, Section Director, Raw Materials Dept., Ministry of Munitions
Brevet-Col. German Sims Woodhead  RAMC
Lt.-Col. Anthony Hudson Woodifield, in charge of Ordnance Depot, Didcot
Capt. Charles Bernard Besly Yule, Royal Arty., Design Dept., Ministry of Munitions

For services in connection with the War in France, Egypt and Salonika —
Capt. John Herbert Boraston, Records Ofc., Operations Section, General Headquarters, France
Capt. William Lawrence Bragg, Depot, Field Survey Company
Maj. William Henry Clifford, Army Printing and Stationery Services
The Reverend Edward Arnold Fitch, Royal Army Chaplains' Dept.
Lt.-Col. Charles Edward Percy Fowler, RAMC
Maj. Francis Arthur Green, Army Printing and Stationery Services
Capt. Myles Higgin-Birket, Cipher Ofc., General Headquarters, British Salonika Force
Maj. Percy Reginald Nelson, Assistant to Ofc.-in-charge of Expeditionary Force Canteens, France
Capt. Marcus Niebuhr Tod, Intelligence Corps, British Salonika Force
Lt.-Col. Edward Constable Wright, in charge of Expeditionary Force Canteens, France

Civil Division
James Adam, Office Supervisor Edinburgh, Scottish Branch, British Red Cross Society
Robert Adam, Late Assistant Director, Railway Materials Branch, Ministry of Munitions
Thomas Martland Ainscough, Sec. to the Textile Committee and to the Standing Committee on Cotton Growing in the Empire
Alexander Alcorn, Ministry of Shipping
Evelyn Julia Allan, Honorary Sec., Chelsea Division, British Red Cross and Order of St. John of Jerusalem
James Allan Chief Engineer, Ellerman Lines
Harry Allden Ofc.-in-Charge, Royal Naval Gun Factory, West Houghton
John Allen, Chairman, Steam Cultivation Development Association, and Hon. Adviser to the Food Production Dept.
Mary Sophia Allen, Chief Superintendent, Women's Police Service
Oswald Coleman Allen, Secretarial Ofc., Ministry of Munitions
William George Allen, Expense Accounts Ofc.; H.M. Dockyard, Portsmouth
William Henry Allen, Vice-Controller, Post Office Stores Dept.
James Willcox Alsop  Chairman, Liverpool Local Tribunal
Amy Douglas Knyveton Anderson, Commandant, Waverley Abbey Auxiliary Hospital, Farnham, Surrey
Lois Dessurne Anderson, Financial Expert Adviser to the Finance Section, Ministry of Blockade
Lt.-Cmdr. Maxwell Henry Anderson, Royal Navy, Trade Division of the Naval Staff
Thomas George Anderson, Superintending Clerk Naval Ordnance Dept., Admiralty
Henry William Archer Manager and Sec. of the British Fishing Vessels War Risks Insurance Association, Ltd.
Henry Armstrong, Sec. in Charge, North-Eastern Division, Y.M.C.A. 
Janet Stevenson Bennett, Lady Arthur, Vice-President of the Troon District, Scottish Branch, British Red Cross Society
Cmdr. Edward Lindsay Ashley Foakes, Royal Navy, Naval Assistant to Director of Army Postal Services, and Nautical Adviser to the Post Office
Peter Wilson Atkin  Chairman of Salford Local Tribunal
Amos Lowrey Ayre, District Director of Shipyard Labour (Glasgow), Admiralty Shipyard Labour Dept.
Philip Henry Bagenal, Inspector, Local Government Board
Francis Edward Bagnall, Section Director, Machine Tool Dept., Ministry of Munitions
Arthur Stowey Bailey, Manager, Messrs. Cammell, Laird & Company, Ltd., Sheffield
Hubert Baines, Deputy Chief Engineer, H.M. Office of Works
Alfred Gabriel Baker, Superintendent of Queen Mary's Workshops, Brighton
George Stephen Baker, Superintendent of the William Froude National Tank, National Physical Laboratory
John William Baker, Manager, Messrs John Baker & Co., Ltd., Rotherham
Robert John Balfour, Director of Finance, Metropolitan Special Constabulary
Charlotte Marie-Louise Banbury, Commandant, Wych Cross Place Auxiliary Hospital, Forest Row, Sussex
William Barber, Superintendent of Live Stock Division, Board of Agriculture for Scotland
Henry Lowthian Barge, Engineer to Messrs. Bullivant & Company, Ltd.
Ernest Augustus William Barnard, Superintending Civil Engineer, Director of Works Dept., Admiralty
Anna Ethel Barnes, Sec. to Central Charities Committee
Henry Barnes  Honorary Sec. and Treasurer, Cumberland Branch, British Red Cross Society
James Sidney Barnes, Acting Principal Clerk, Sec.'s Dept., Admiralty
James Ronnie Barnett, Messrs. G. L. Watson & Company, Glasgow
Alfred Barrow, Mayor of Barrow-in-Furness; Chairman of the Local Tribunal
Capt. Edmund Burton Bartlett, Peninsular and Oriental Steam Navigation Company, Ltd.
Frederick William Bartlett, Principal Clerk, Pay Office
Cmdr. Frederick Mortimer Barwick, Royal Navy, Portmaster and Marine Superintendent, Great Central Railway
Lt.-Col. William Fortescue Basset, Ministry of National Service
Capt. Ernest William Bastard, British Steam Shipping Company
Muriel Bather, Vice-President and Commandant, Cyngfield Auxiliary Hospital, Shrewsbury
James Allan Battarsby, Clerk to the Guardians, Nottingham; Honorary Sec. of the Local Representative Committee, and Sec. of the Local War Pensions Committee
Edith, Lady Baxter, Honorary Representative of the Ministry of Pensions, Central Scotland
Peter McLeod Baxter, Engineering Partner, Messrs. McKie & Baxter, Govan
Willoughby Lake Baylay, Manager, Birmingham Small Arms Company, Ltd., Birmingham
Ernest Edward Boyle Beamer, Superintendent of Registry, Home Office
Joseph James Beard, Acting Chief Accountant in the War Office
George Howard Beaton, Managing Director, Messrs. G. Beaton & Son, London
Clara Constance Beausire, Vice-President, Birkenhead Division, British Red Cross and Order of St. John of Jerusalem
Alfred Bednell, Sec., Coventry Munitions Board of Management
Susan Heard Beevor, Donor and Commandant, Hoveton Hall Auxiliary Hospital, Wrexham, Norfolk
Hubert Dowson Bell, Head of the Wheat Section of the Commercial Services Branch, Ministry of Shipping
William Thomas Bell, Messrs. Robey & Company, Lincoln
Geoffrey Thomas Bennett  Fellow and Mathematical Lecturer, Emmanuel College, Cambridge; Scientific Assistant, Compass Dept., Admiralty. Algernon Edward Berriman, Chief Engineer, Daimler Company, Ltd.
William Lewis Berrow  Registrar, Foreign Office
Alys Mary Bertie-Perkins, Sec. and Organizer, Swansea District, British Red Cross Society
Francis George Lawder Bertram, Secretarial Ofc., Ministry of Munitions
Rosamond Bertram-Corbet, Lady Superintendent, Grosvenor Gardens Y.M.C.A. Hut
Henry Bucknall Betterton, Liaison Ofc. between the War Trade Intelligence Dept. and the Admiralty, War Office and Ministry of Munitions
Herbert Bing, Managing Director, Banbury National Filling Factory, Ministry of Munitions
Oswell Barritt Binns, Section Director, Gun Ammunition 
Manufacture, Ministry of Munitions
John Bissett, Sec., Manchester Munitions Cooperative Board of Management
Lt. David Blair, Royal Naval Reserve
Frank Blake, Partner, Messrs. W. E. Blake, Explosives Loading Co., London
Constance Caldwell Bloomfield, Lady Superintendent, Empire Union Club for Soldiers and Sailors
Clara Blount, Commandant, Stildon House Auxiliary Hospital, East Grinstead, Sussex
James Cairns Bogle  Provost of Falkirk; Chairman of Local Tribunal
Henry Patrick Bolaud, Secretarial Ofc., Ministry of Munitions
William Bonney, Naval Store Ofc., H.M. Dockyard, Portsmouth
Harry Booth, Principal Clerk, Harbour Dept., Board of Trade
John Oliver Borley, Superintendent Naturalist Inspector in Fisheries Division of the Board of Agriculture
Percy Dunville Botterell, Assistant Commercial Attache to His Britannic Majesty's Legation, Holland
William Cecil Bottomley, Principal Clerk, Colonial Office
John Bourdeaux, Submarine Superintendent, General Post Office
Sarah Fanny, Llady Bowater, Organiser of Red Cross Work, Birmingham
Frederick Gatus Bowers, Section Director, Finance Dept., Ministry of Munitions
Thomas Anderson Bowman, Chief Engineer, Prince Line, Ltd.
William Turnbull Bowman, Assistant Director, Central Stores Dept., Ministry of Munitions
Harry Robert Boyd, Late Assistant Private Sec., Home Office
Sydney Edward Boyland, Royal Corps of Naval Constructors
Hugh Bramwell, Member of Colliery Recruiting Court, South Wales; Member of Advisory Board to Controller of Coal Mines
David Alexander Bremner, Late Head of Aluminium Section, Ministry of Munitions
Edgar Brierley  Chairman, Manchester Local Tribunal
William Richard Brunskill Briscoe, Late Crown Prosecutor for Egypt
Flight Cmdr. Frank Arthur Brock, Royal Naval Air Service
Archibald Brown, Commandant, Liverpool Special Constabulary
Jonathan Boswell Brown, Wilfred Gordon Brown, Legal Assistant, Ministry of Munitions
Jeffrey Browning  Assistant Sec. to the Board of Customs and Excise
Charles Matthewes Bruce, Acting Assistant Accountant-General of the Navy
Ellen Maud, Lady Bruce, Vice-President and Organizer of West Bridgford Auxiliary Hospital, Nottinghamshire
Frederick Bryant, Royal Corps of Naval Constructors
Jane Buchanan, Superintendent (Female Staff), Post Office Savings Bank Dept.
Joseph Andrew William Buchanan, Comptroller of Accounts, H.M. Office of Works
Alfred Virgoe Buckland, Deputy Chief Valuer and Compensation Officer, Directorate of Lands, Ministry of Munitions
Walter Henry Bulpitt, Managing Director of Messrs. Bulpitt, Ltd., Birmingham
Maj. Frederick Burch, Home Forces Staff
Kenneth Paul Burgess, Deputy Head of the Technical Services Branch, Ministry of Shipping
Hubert Francis Daubeny Burke, Section Director, Central Stores Dept., Ministry of Munitions
May Burke, Commandant, Urmston and Fairfield Auxiliary Hospitals, Eastbourne
The Hon. Ethel Louise Burn, Commandant and Matron, Stoodley Knowle Auxiliary Hospital, Torquay
Ethel Burnett, Vice-President, Kincardineshire, Scottish Branch, British Red Cross Society
Ethel Margaret Burnside, Assistant County Director, Hertfordshire, British Red Cross and Order of St. John of Jerusalem
William Parker Burton  Vice-Chairman, Flour Mills Control Committee
Margery Bush, Bishop's Knoll Auxiliary Hospital, Bristol
Squadron-Cmdr. Henry Richard Busteed, Royal Naval Air Service
Arthur Francis Butler, Section Director of Labour Supply Dept., Ministry of Munitions
William John Cable, Sec. of the Central Council of United Alien Relief Societies
Elizabeth Mary Cadbury
Lily Eliza Frances, Lady Caillard, Donor, Wingfield Auxiliary Hospital, Trowbridge, Wiltshire
Percy Pyne Caldecott-Smith  Chief Surveyor, Director of Works Dept., Admiralty
Mary Louisa Caldwell, Divisional Sec. and Deputy County Director, British Red Cross and Order of St. John of Jerusalem; Lady Superintendent of Minley Auxiliary Hospital, Hampshire
Philip Cambray, Private Sec. to the Minister of National Service
Joan Jessie Cameron, Organiser of Scottish Work, Munition Workers Welfare Committee, Y.W.C.A.
Alexander Campbell, Managing Director, Hunslet Engine Company, Ltd., Leeds
Florence Ishbel Campbell, Organising Sec., Munition Workers' Welfare Committee, Y.W.C.A.
Gordon Charles Henry Campbell, Section Director of Labour RegulationDept., Ministry of Munitions
Athol John Capron, Managing Director, Messrs. Davey Bros., Sheffield
Mary Gertrude Carden, Honorary Sec., Women's Patrol Service, National Union of Women Workers
Frederick Carl, Sec., National Egg Collection Committee
Walter Carlile  Organising Ofc., Buckinghamshire Special Constabulary
William Allan Carter  Town Councillor of Edinburgh; Member n of Local Tribunal
Edward Henry Carter, His Majesty's Inspector of Schools
Maud Cator, Donor and Commandant, Woodbastwick Hall Auxiliary Hospital, Norwich
Squadron Cmdr. Robert Arthur Chalmers, Royal Naval Air Service
John Alfred Cuthbert Champion, Civil Assistant to Controller, Admiralty
Maj. Samuel Stewart Champion  Area Headquarters Recruiting Ofc., Birmingham
Edward David Chetham-Strode, Legal Assistant, Ministry of Munitions
Dehra Chichester, Vice-President of St. John's Voluntary Aid Detachments for Belfast
Henry Churchill, Commercial Dept., Foreign Office
Maj. William Henry Dennis Clark, Munitions Inventions Dept.
Geoffrey Rothe Clarke, Late Statistical Ofc., Inspection Dept., Ministry of Munitions
James Alexander Clarke, Chairman of the Local Tribunal of the County of Ayr
John Courtenay Clarke, Acting Assistant Director of Contracts, Admiralty
Col. Henry Clay, Deputy Director of Recruiting, Eastern Command
Robert Clay  Clerk to the Guardians, Shoreditch
Harris Peugeot Cleaver, Clerk to the Guardians, West Derby
Andrew Cochrane, Managing Director, Messrs. Cochrane & Sons, Ltd., Selby
George Bertram Cockburn, Inspector of Aeroplanes, Aeronautical Inspection Directorate
William Coggan, Technical Adviser (Hides & Skins) to the War Office
William George Cole, Chief Constructor, H.M. Dockyard, Sheerness
Richard James Coles, Assistant Director of Finance, Ministry of Pensions
Lt.-Cmdr. John Alsager Collett, Royal Navy
Capt. Reginald Blayney Colmore, Royal Navy
Capt. Superintendent of the Training Ship Exmouth
Arthur Douglas Constable, Superintending Electrical Engineers Dept., Admiralty
Elizabeth Cooper, Honorary Sec. and Treasurer of the Milford Haven and South Wales Minesweepers Comforts Supply Association
Ernest Napier Cooper, Superintending Aliens Ofc.
Harry Stowe Coppock, Manager, Messrs. Sir W. G. Armstrong, Whitworth & Company, Ltd., Elswick
Mary Caroline Coulcher, Vice-President and Lady District Superintendent, St. John Ambulance Brigade; Commandant, Broadwater Auxiliary Hospital, Suffolk
Fulwar Cecil Ashton Coventry, Section Director, Inland Transport Dept., Ministry of Munitions
Jane Cowen, Bernard Henry Cox, Senior Clerk, Exchequer and Audit Dept.
Oswald Cox, Inspector of Gun Ammunition (Technical), Ministry of Munitions
William Brownfield Craig, Assistant County Director, Totnes Division, British Red Cross and Order of St. John of Jerusalem
John McGregor Cramond, Assistant Divisional Ofc. for Scotland Division, Employment Exchanges
Florentia Maria Crawshay, Vice-President and Commandant, St. Anne's Hall Auxiliary Hospital, Caversham, Berkshire
Laura Alexander Bell Cree, Convener of Headquarters Organising Clothing Committee and Stores and Despatch Committee of the Scottish Branch, British Red Cross Society
Ernest Samuel Croft, Acting Assistant Accountant-General of the Navy
Claud Crompton, Inspector, Small Arms Ammunition, Ministry of Munitions
Edward Cropper, Architect, First Class, H.M. Office of Works
Marjorie Crosbie-Hill, Organiser of Canteens and Clubs, Munition Workers Welfare Committee, Y.W.C.A.
Josiah Crosby, His Britannic Majesty's Consul, Senaggora
Richard Basil Cross, Private Sec., Local Government Board
Clifford William Croysdill, Superintendent of Royal Victoria Yard, Deptford
Herbert Edmond Cuff  Principal Medical Ofc. to the Metropolitan Asylums Board
James William Henry Culling, Assistant Director of Victualling, Admiralty
Herbert Ashley Cunard Cummins, Chargé d'Affaires at His Britannic Majesty's Legation in Mexico
Paymaster-in-Chief Henry Ashley Travel's Cummins, Royal Navy
William Cunliffe  Chairman, Rochdale Local Tribunal
Capt. Frederick Joseph Cunnington, Chief Staff Ofc. to County Director, and Chief Transport Ofc., Middlesex, British Red Cross and Order of St. John of Jerusalem
Kathleen Alice Cuthbert, Vice-President, British Red Cross Society, Northumberland
Olive Cuthbertson  Contraband Dept., Foreign Office
Capt. William John Dagnall, Commodore Capt., Royal Mail Steam Packet Co.
Percy Gough Dallinger, Assistant Director, Supplies Division, Food Production Dept.
Robert Washington Dana, Sec. of the Institution of Naval Architects
James Stewart Davidson, Honorary Sec., County of Aberdeen War Work Association
Cmdr. Andrew William Davies, Royal Navy, Chief Naval Censor, Press Bureau
Lt.-Col. William Northcote Davis  Chief Ofc., Slough Division, Buckinghamshire Special Constabulary
Lt. Albert Edward Dawson  Naval Intelligence Division, Admiralty
Margaret Darner Dawson, Commandant of Women's Police Service
Hervey Angus de Montmorency, Sec. to the Tonnage Priority Committee; Personal Assistant to the Director of Ship Requisitioning
Frederick Walter Dendy  Vice-Chairman, Northumberland Appeal Tribunal (Newcastle Panel)
Mark Thomas Denne, Section Director, Small Arms and Machine Guns Dept., Ministry of Munitions
Cmdr. Alexander Guthrie Denniston  Naval Intelligence Division, Admiralty
Muriel Evelyn De Rougemont, Commandant, Coombe Lodge Auxiliary Hospital, Warley, Essex
Henry Charles Dickens, Comm. under Military Service (Civil Liabilities) Committee
Thomas Cantrel Dillon  His Majesty's Consul, Porto Alegre, Brazil
George Morton Discombe, Acting Assistant Director of Stores, Admiralty
Gertrude Caroline Dixon  Sec., Wheat Executive, Ministry of Food
William Vibart Dixon, Deputy Clerk, Yorkshire West Riding County Council; Clerk to Yorkshire West Riding (Eastern Central) Appeal Tribunal
James Downs  Cmdr., Hull Special Constabulary
Margaret Dudgeon, Vice-President and Acting President, Stewartry of Kirkcudbright, Scottish Branch, British Red Cross Society
Mildred Mabel Gordon Duff, President, Banffshire, Scottish Branch, British Red Cross Society
George Chester Duggian, Military Sea Transport Branch, Ministry of Shipping
Leland Lewis Duncan  Chief Examiner and Acting Assistant Principal, War Office
Malcolm James Rowley Dunstan, Food Production Comm. for Kent and Surrey; Principal of the South Eastern Agricultural College, Wye
Percy Durant, Manager, Paris Office of Ministry of Munitions
Sir Arthur Isaac Durant  Controller of Supplies, H.M. Office of Works
William Moore Dyball, District Superintendent, Brighton, London, Brighton and South Coast Railway
Edward Jerome Dyer  Honorary General Sec. of the Vegetable Products Committee for Naval Supply
Stephen Eastern  Chairman, Newcastle Local Tribunal
John Edmond, Chairman of Stirling Local Tribunal
Lt. Cmdr. Leslie Wynn Edmunds 
David John William Edwardes
Charles James Edwards, Finance Branch Ministry of Shipping
George Henry Edwards, Private Sec. to the Comm. of Metropolitan Police
James Eggar, Principal Clerk, H.M. Office of Works
Edwin Charles Eldred, Chief of the Staff of the War Trade Dept.
Capt. Frederick Barnard Elliot
Freight Manager, Royal Commission on Wheat Supplies
John Henry Ellis, Late Town Clerk of Plymouth and Clerk to the Plymouth Local Tribunal
Thomas Elvy Elvy, Engineering Assistant to Director of Dockyards and Repairs, Admiralty
John Emberton  Chairman, Cheshire War Agricultural Executive Committee
Lt. Corris William Evans, Private Sec. to the Director of Transports and Shipping
Maj. Herbert Evans, Principal Clerk, Ministry of Pensions
Thomas Henry Rovston Evans  Chairman of Fulham Local Tribunal
Basil Preston Everett, Head of Drawing Office, Air Board, Technical Dept.
William Herbert Lee Ewart, Telegram Dept. Foreign Office
Robert Crosbie Farmer  Research Dept., Woolwich
Herbert Ernest Fass, Senior Examiner, Board of Education
Frederick J. Fedarb, Sec. in Charge, Y.M.C.A., Salisbury Plain
Dora Fielden, Commandant of Auxiliary Hospital, Kineton, Warwickehire
Henry Foreman, Mayor of Hammersmith
Lady Mary Forster, Dowager Duchess of Hamilton, Donor and Commandant, Easton Hall Auxiliary Hospital, Wickham Market, Suffolk 
Cecil Lewis Fortescue, Professor of Physics, Royal Navy College, Greenwich
Harold Augustus Fortingiton, Raw Materials Branch of Requirements and Statistics Dept., Ministry of Munitions
James Foster, Chief Engineer, W. and C. T. Jones Steamship Company, Ltd.
Joseph Francis  Mayor of Southend-on-Sea; Chairman, of Local Tribunal
Leonard Benjamin Franklin, Robert Francis Franklin, Sec. to the Admiral Superintendent, H.M. Dockyard, Devonport
Lt. Thomas Frazer, Technical Assistant in Statistics Dept., Ministry of National Service
Robert Freeman, Technical Assistant, Surveyor-General of Supplies Dept., War Office
The Hon. Essex Eleonor Ffrench, Honorary Sec., Almeric Paget Military Massage Corps
Henry Leon French, General Sec., Food Production Dept.
Reginald Thomas George French, Munitions Inventions Dept.
E. J. Allan Frost, Sec. in Charge, Aldershot Division, Y.M.C.A. 
Mark Edwin Pesoott Frost  Sec. to the Admiral Superintendent, H.M. Dockyard, Portsmouth
David Bowie Fulton, Section Director, Central Stores Dept., Ministry of Munitions
William Raledsrh Kerr Gandell, Divisional Director in the Dept. of Commercial Intelligence, Board of Trade
Lt.-Cmdr. Eric Worsley Gandy 
Annie Elizabeth Gardner, Senior Organising Ofc. for Women's Work, London and South-Eastern Division, Employment Exchanges
Edward Theodore Gardom, Clerk to the Gloucestershire County Council; Clerk to the Gloucestershire Appeal Tribunal
Lt. John William Frederick Garvey 
George Gentry, Capt. James German, Ministry of National Service
William Doig Gibb, Consulting Gas Engineer to Explosives Supply Dept., Ministry of Munitions
Joseph Hamilton Gibson, Mamagier of Engineering Dept., Messrs. Cammell, Laird & Company, Ltd.; Member of Committee of tihe Board of Inventions and Research, Admiralty
John Watson Gibson, Late in charge of Production of Shells, Guns and Small Arms Ammunition in U.S.A., Ministry of Munitions
William John Gick, Naval Store Ofc., Grand Fleet
Archibald Gilchrist  Engineering Managing Director, Messrs. Barclay, Curie & Company Limited, Glasgow
John Gledhill, Naval Ordnance Store Ofc., Crombie
William James Glenny, Chief Staff Ofc., Commercial Intelligence Dept., Board of Trade
James Thomas Goalen, Bailie of the Burgh of Leith
Lionel Frederic Goldsmid, Finance Branch, Ministry of Shipping
Edward Gomersall, Superintending Engineer, General Post Office
Gertrude Esperance Goodsir, Administrator and Donor, Wallacefield Auxiliary Hospital, Coombe Lane, South Croydon, Surrey
Col. Henry Erskine Gordon, Ex-Convener of Renfrewshire; Member of the Local Tribunal
William James Gordon, Engine Designer and Indoor Manager, Messrs. Tickers, Ltd., Barrow
Thomas Gowans, Senior Chief Engineer, Pacific Steam Navigation Company
Warden Gowing, Clerk, Munitions Tribunal, London
Mary Louise, Marchioness of Graham, Vice-President, Plomesgate Division, British Red Cross and Order of St. John of Jerusalem; Donor, Easton Hall, Auxiliary Hospital, Suffolk. 
Allan Graham, Commercial Adviser to His Majesty's Legation at Copenhagen
Arthur John Wood Graham, Inspector of Munitions Areas, Newcastle
Capt. John Irvine Graham, Royal Navy, Inspector General of Customs Waterguard
Selwyn Seafield Grant, Superintending Engineer, Ministry of Munitions, No. 7 Area (Metropolis and S.E. England)
Lt. William Grant  Fishery Capt., Grimsby
William Grant, Chief Engineer, Anchor Line 
Maj. John Grapes, Senior Assistant to Col. in Charge of Records, Army Service Corps
Robert Gray 
Edward William Green, Messrs. Green and Silley, Weir
Mary Anne Green, Commandant, Wardown Auxiliary Hospital, Bedfordshire
Lt. Donald McNeill Greig, Supply Ofc. in Aeroplane Supply Branch, Air Board
The Hon. Mabel Elizabeth Georgiana Greville, Vice-President, Chelmsford Division, British Red Cross and Order of St. John of Jerusalem; Chairman of Red Cross Depot, Essex
Sarah Gilbert Griffiths, Commandant and in Charge of Transport, Bristol, British Red Cross and Order of St. John of Jerusalem. 
Richard Henry Grimbly  Assistant County Director, Ashburton Division, British Red Cross and Order of St. John of Jerusalem; Deputy Comm. of St. John, Devonshire
Wilfrid Grimshaw, Section Director, Contracts Dept., Ministry of Munitions
Maj. Harold Grinsted, Chief Engineer, Royal Aircraft Factory
William Edward Gundill 
Godfrey Digby Napier Haggard, Chargé d'Affaires at His Britannic Majesty's Legation in Bolivia
William Thomas Hanman, Assistant Director, Factory Construction, Ministry of Munitions
Jane Ewing Hannay
Alfred John Harding, First Class Clerk, Colonial Office
Samuel Hare  Member of Colliery Recruiting Court, South Durham
John Allen Harker  Munitions Inventions Dept.
Ernest Alfred Harris, Collector, Long Room, Custom House
Emily Margaret Harrison
Richard Frederick Hartley, Controller of Small Arms Ammunition Factory, Woolwich Arsenal
Vernon Hartshorn  South Wales Miners Federation; Member of Coal Mining Organization Committee; Member of Advisory Board to Controller of Coal Mines; Member of Colliery Recruiting Court, South Wales
Theodore Edward Hart-Smith, Section Director, Dept. of Area Organization, Ministry of Munitions
Ada Sophia Lucy Hatfield, Lady Sec. at Headquarters, Y.M.C.A.
Cyril George Hatherley, Inspector of Munitions Areas, Glasgow
Maj. Charles Hebert, Design Dept., Ministry of Munitions
Cmdr. Philip Herbert 
Charles Heron-Watson, Comm. for Sutherlandshire Boy Scouts
Charles James Higginson, Sec. of the Restriction of Enemy Supplies Dept.
George Edward Hilleary, Town Clerk of West Ham
Percy John Hinks, Controller of Filling Factories, Woolwich Arsenal
Albert Ernest Hoare  Honorary Sec. and Treasurer of Suffolk Branch, British Red Cross and Order of St. John of Jerusalem
Lt. John Hodgens 
Charles Courtenay Hodgson, Clerk to the Cumberland County Council; Clerk to the Cumberland and Westmorland Appeal Tribunal
John Alexander Hodgson, Late Chief Engineer, H.M. Dockyard, Sheerness
The Hon. Elizabeth Odeyne Hodgson, Sec. and Commandant of Clopton War Hospital, Town Hall, Stratford, Warwickshire
Capt. Norman Edward Holden, Late Deputy Director-General, Mechanical Warfare, Ministry of Munitions
Julia Holland, Donor and Commandant of Auxiliary Hospital, Brand Lodge, Colwall, Malvern
Alfred Ewart Holly, Manager of H.M. Factory, Oldbury, Ministry of Munitions
Constance Holmes, Lady Inspector, Army Pay Dept.
Cmdr. Gerard-Hobert Addison Holmes 
William Holmes, Accountant in the War Office
Frederic Home, Food Production Comm. for Devon, Cornwall and Somerset
Frederick James Howard, Section Director, Finance Dept., Ministry of Munitions
Godfrey Valentine Howell, Head of the Shipping Intelligence Section, Ministry of Snipping
Arthur Hughes, of the Firm of Messrs. Hughes and Son, Ltd., Opticians
Aubrey Patrick Hughes-Gibb, Private Sec. to the Food Controller
Gilbert Humphreys, Deputy Controller, Gun Ammunition Manufacture, Ministry of Munitions
John Hunt, Town Clerk of Westminster, Clerk to the Westminster Local Tribunal
Joseph Hunt  Deputy Civil Assistant, Woolwich Arsenal
Thomas Charles Hunter, Superintending Civil Engineer, Director of Works Dept., Admiralty
Alan Hutchings, Chief Personal Assistant to the DirectorGeneral of Voluntary Organisations
Arthur Hutchinson, Fellow of Pembroke College, Cambridge; University Demonstrator of Mineralogy
Emily Fenton Arrnitage Hutton, Commandant, Brookdale Auxiliary Hospital, Alderley Edge, Cheshire
William George Hynard, Head of the Collier Section, Ministry of Shipping
Louis Infeld, War Trade Statistical Dept.
William Edward Ireland, Late Chief Engineer, Metropolitan Munition Committee
Lt. Cmdr. Thomas Cutlhbert Irwin 
Harold Benjamin Jacks, Late Head of High Speed Steel Section, Raw Materials Branch, Ministry of Munitions
John Jackson, Trades Comm. of the National Service Dept., and Technical Adviser to the Reserved Occupations Committee
Laura Jackson, Vice-President, Solihull Division, British Red Cross and Order of St. John of Jerusalem; Donor, Norton Cottage and Springfield Auxiliary Hospitals, Warwickshire
George Charles James, Principal Clerk and Rating Surveyor to the Corporation of London; Clerk to the City of London Tribunal
Henry Charles Jefferies, Late Sec. to Advisory Committee, Controlled Establishments Branch, Ministry of Munitions
William Douglas Johnston, Principal Technical Ofc., Fish Supplies Branch, Ministry of Food
Arthur Jones, Superintendent, Remount Depot, Worcester
Arthur Dansey Jones, Locomotive Running Superintendent, South-Eastern and Chatham Railway
Patrick Nicholas Hill Jones, Inspector of Gun Ammunition (Supervisory) London, Metropolitan Area, Ministry of Munitions
Samuel Nathan Jones, Chairman, Monmouthshire War Agricultural Executive Committee
Lt. Theodore Warren Jones 
John Francis Jones, Adviser to Contraband Dept. on Wool Questions
Andrew Cassels Kay, Assistant Charity Comm.
Sydney Herbert Kaye, Sec. of the Plate Refrigerated Tonnage Committee
Rupert Hales Headlam Keenlyside, Section Director of Labour Regulation Dept., Ministry of Munitions
Alfred Evans Kelly, Chief Engineer, Tatem Steam Navigation Company 
Elizabeth Hariott Kelly  War Pensions Committee and Portsmouth Local Charities, Portsmouth
The Reverend John Kelman  Y.M.C.A. Worker
Cmdr. Hubert Wynn Kenrick  Royal Naval Reserve Shipping Intelligence Ofc., London
Lady Anne Kerr, County Director and Vice-President for Midlothian, Scottish Branch, British Red Cross Society
Samuel Kidner, Member of the President of the Board of Agriculture's Food Production Dept. Advisory Committee
Arthur Ernest Kimpton, Sec. to the Admiral Superintendent, H.M. Dockyard, Chatham
Mary Liddon King, Commandant and Vice President, Standish Auxiliary Hospital, Stonehouser Gloucestershire
The Hon. Emily Kinnaird, Director of Appeal, Munition Workers' Welfare Committee, Y.W.C.A.
Arthur Ernest Kirkus, Statistical Dept., Admiralty
William Dennett Kirkwood, Superintending Engineer, Ministry of Munitions, No. 9 Area (W. Scotland)
Matthew Kissane, Assistant Director of Materials and Priority, Controller's Dept., Admiralty
Christopher Newman Knight, Section Director, Contracts Branch, Air Board
Constance Mary, Lady Knowles, Vice-President of Camberley Division, British Red Cross and Order of St. John; Commandant of Camberley Auxiliary Hospital, Surrey
Edwin Max Konstam, Assistant Director, Local Organisation Division, Food Production Dept.
Herman Landau, Chairman of the Jewish Refugees Committee
Evelyn Louisa Lascelles, Commandant, Auxiliary Hospital, Grove House, Harrogate
George Philip Langton, Section Director of Labour Supply Dept., Ministry of Munitions
Clement Martin le Breton  Comm. under Military Service (Civil Liabilities) Committee
James Crawford Ledlie, Chief Clerk, and Deputy Clerk of the Council, Privy Council Office
John William Lee, Commandant and Organiser of Transport in Lincolnshire, British Red Cross and Order of St. John of Jerusalem
Alice Gwynllyan Lee-Williams, Commandant, Auxiliary Hospital, Gloucester
Henry Aufrere Leggett, First Class Clerk, Local Government Board
Lady Ada Edwina Stewart Lewin, Acting Commandant, Ascot Auxiliary Military Hospital, Berkshire
Herbert David William Lewis, Deputy Comm. for the Order of St. John of Jerusalem in South Wales
Ruth Lewis, Lady Superintendent, Earl Street Y.M.C.A. 
Alan Wadsworth Lidderdale, Contraband Dept., Foreign Office
Tinsley Lindley  Chief Ofc., Nottingham Special Constabulary
James Brown Lindsay, Cashier. H.M. Dockyard, Chatham
Staff Paymaster James Scott Little, Royal Naval Reserve
Capt. Arthur Athelwold Lloyd  Sec., Sussex Territorial Force Association
George Richard Boycott Loch, Section Director, Contracts Dept., Ministry of Munitions
John Lomax  Sec., Merioneth and Montgomery Territorial Force Association
William Low, Acting Convener of Fifeshire; Member of Appeal Tribunal
Thomas Martin Lowry  Technical Adviser on Amatol, Ministry of Munitions
Mildred Lowther, Lady Superintendent, Army Pay, Dept.
Maj. Edward James Lugard  Naval Intelligence Division
Charles Lupton, Ex-Lord Mayor of Leeds
Capt. Robert J. MacAlpine, Member of British Military Equipments Section in Russia, Ministry of Munitions
Thomas Symington Macaulay, Provost of the Burgh of Dumfries; Chairman of Local Tribunal
George William MacDonald, Chief Chemist to Messrs. Curtis and Harvey, Ltd.
James Macdonald, Chief Engineer, Cunard Steamship Co., Ltd.
Sheena Macdonald, Sec., St. Marylebone Division, British Red Cross and Order of St. John of Jerusalem
Hugh Macfarlane, Manager, Singer Manufacturing Company, Limited, Glasgow
Peter Macfarlane  Provost of Port Glasgow
Finlay Matheson Mackenzie 
John Mackintosh, Section Director, Trench Warfare Supply Dept., Ministry of Munitions
William MacLennan  Chairman of Local Tribunal, Kirkwall
Charles Henry MacLintock, Section Director, Finance Dept. Ministry of Munitions
Henry William Macrosty, Assistant Director of the Census of Production, Board of Trade
Capt. Edmund Distin Maddick 
Mary Sybil Mainwaring, Part Donor and Commandant, Trimpley Hall Auxiliary Hospital, Ellesmere, Shropshire
Jessy Mair, Head of Bacon Distribution Section, Ministry of Food
Albany Featherstonehaugh Major, Principal Clerk in the War Office
Frederick Henry Dumas Man, Senior Partner of Messrs. E. D. and F. Man, Mincing Lane
Arthur Woodroffe Manton, Late in Charge of Production of Lewis Guns, Copper Driving Bands, Brass Rods, etc., in U.S.A., Ministry of Munitions
Charles William Maplesden, Assistant Director of Barrack Construction, War Office
Winifred Marsden, Commandant, Colliton Auxiliary Hospital, Dorchester
Ernest William Marsh, General Manager of Woolcombers, Ltd.; Chairman of the Woolcombers Federation
The Hon. Joan Marsham, Lady Superintendent, Queen Mary Y.M.C.A. Hostel for Ofc.s and Y.M.C.A. Hut, Sloane Square
Charles Selwyn Martin, Assistant Director of Horticulture and Head of Food Preserving Section, Food Production Dept.
Hubert Stanley Martin, Chief Passport Ofc., Foreign Office
Alexander Neil Mason, First Class Manager, Leeds Employment Exchange
James Matson, Chief Investigation Ofc. for Scotland, Ministry of Munitions
Arthur Matthews, Manager, Messrs. Sir W. G. Armstrong, Whitworth & Company, Ltd., Openshaw
Thomas Leigh Matthews, Late Section Director, Dept. of Area Organization, Ministry of Munitions
Percy Matthey  Managing Director, Messrs. Johnson, Matthey and Co., Ltd., London
Capt. Leslie Blythe Maxwell, Ofc. Commanding Friends Ambulance Unit, France and Belgium
Richard Cowdy Maxwell  Inspector, Local Government Board
Katharine Edith May, Sec., Hampstead Division, British Red Cross and Order of St. John of Jerusalem; Donor and Administrator, Cedar Lawn Auxiliary Hospital, Hampstead
Frances McAdam, Commandant, Greenhill Auxiliary Hospital, Sherborne
James McCaffery, Superintending Electrical Engineer's Dept., Admiralty
Charles Home McCall, Section Director, Raw Materials Dept., Ministry of Munitions
John McCann, Chairman of the Hull Fishing Vessel Owners Association, and Port Fishery Capt.
Robert McCann, Headquarters-Staff, Y.M.C.A. 
William McClelland, Electrical Engineering Assistant to Director of Dockyards and Repairs, Admiralty
Lt.-Cmdr. William Holdsworth McConnel 
Dept. of the Director of Torpedoes and Mining, Admiralty
Thomas McEwen, Traffic Manager, Highland Railway
Andrew McFarlane, Acting Assistant Superintendent of Ordnance Stores
Joseph McFarlane, Chief Engineer, Donaldson Line
Howard Addison McFerran, Chief Engineer, H.M. Office of Works
James McGowan
John James McKeown, Manager, Messrs. Vickers, Limited, Barrow
Richard McLaren, of the Firm of Messrs. Babcock & Wilcox, Ltd.
Capt. Peter McLean, Anchor Line, Ltd.
Capt. Neil McNeil, Ellerman City Line
Gilbert McPherson, General Manager, Georgetown Filling Factory, Ministry of Munitions
Wilfrid Medd, Accountant-General's Dept., Admiralty
Alexander James Pople Menzies, Sheriff Substitute of Caithness; Chairman of Appeal Tribunal
George Babbington Michell, His Britannic Majesty's Consul, Para.
William Millar, Head of the Greenock and Grangemouth Dockyard Company
Arnold Henry Miller, Town Clerk of Norwich; Clerk to the Local Tribunal
Frank Lawrence Miller, Assistant Chief of Section, Central Office, Employment Dept., Ministry of Labour
Arthur Noel Mobbs, Assistant Director, Mechanical Cultivation Division, Food Production Dept.
James Moffat  Provost of the Burgh of Forfar
Alexander Moir, Metropolitan Superintending Engineer, General Post Office
Thomas Fell Molyneux, District Superintendent (London), London and South Western Railway
Frederick William Moneypenny  Sec. to the Lord Mayor of Belfast
Maj. Charles Babington Smith Monfries, Finance Sec. to the Commission Internationale de Ravitaillement
David Taylor Monteith, Deputy Director of Naval Sea Transport Branch, Ministry of Shipping
Evelyn Moore, Organiser of Canteens, Hostels and Clubs, Munition Workers Welfare Committee, Y.W.C.A.
Harold Moore, Research Dept., Woolwich Arsenal
Jasper Frederick More, Military Intelligence Branch, War Office
Charles Morgan, His Britannic Majesty's Consul, Rome
Henry Morris, Superintendent of Royal Clarence Yard, Gosport.
Col. John Morrison  Chairman of Local Tribunal, Golspie, Sutherland
George A. Morrow, Director of Aviation, Imperial Munitions Board, Canada
Owen Edward Mott  Head Chemist at H.M. Factory, Oldbury, Ministry of Munitions
George Frederick Mulherion, Managing Director of the Tyne Iron Shipbuilding Company, Ltd.
William Murison, County Clerk of Aberdeenshire
Howard Murray, Chairman of Explosives Committee, Imperial Munitions Board, Canada
James Murray, Chairman, Surrey War Agricultural Executive Committee
Thomas Roberts Murray, Managing Director of Messrs. Spencer & Company, Ltd., Melksham
William Nash
Ethel Nest Newall, Commandant and Organiser of Auxiliary Hospital, Dilston Hall, Corbridge; Commandant of Auxiliary Hospital, Northumberland 22
Leonard Newitt, Electrical Engineer, H.M. Dockyard, Chatham
Archibald Newlands, Engineer and Sec., Dundee Munitions Board of Management
Florence Jane Helen, Dowager Baroness Nunburnholme, Donor, Naval Hospital, Hull
Francis George Nutt, Accountant-General's Dept., Admiralty
Wing-Cmdr. Alec Ogilvie, Royal Naval Air Service, Head of Aeroplane Design Section, Air Board Technical Dept.
James George O'Keefe, War Office and Ministry of Munitions Financial Representative in U.S.A
Reta Oldham, Chairman of Headmistresses Committee for Inspecting Girls from Secondary Schools for Employment at War Office
John William Lambton Oliver, Naval Store Ofc., H.M. Dockyard, Devonport
Philip Milner Oliver, County Sec., East Lancashire, British Red Cross and Order of St. John of Jerusalem
Jonathan Orchard, Deputy Chief Inspector, Customs and Excise
Frederic Stanley Osgood  Clerk of the Central Chancery of Orders of Knighthood
Henry Overman 
Lt.-Cmdr. Henry Edward Clarence Paget 
Marian Palmer. District Superintendent and Commandant, Auxiliary Hospital, Whinney House, Gateshead
Philip Palmer, Royal Corps of Naval Constructors
Winnie Pardoe, Organiser and Commandant, St. John Hospital, Barry Island, Glamorgan
Thomas Park, First Class Manager, Shoreditch Employment Exchange
George Phillips Parker  Mayor of Holborn; Chairman, Holborn Local Tribunal
Owen Parker  Chairman of the Local Advisory Committee, Kettering
Ethel Mary Parker-Jervis, Commandant, Sandon Hall Auxiliary Hospital, Staffordshire
Harry Edgar Parlett, Assistant Director of Ship Repairs, Controller's Dept., Admiralty
Clifford Copland Paterson, National Physical Laboratory
Lt. Thomas Paterson, Inspector, Sheffield Special Constabulary
Alexander Alan Paton, Assistant in the United States to the Trade Dept., Foreign Office (Declined honour)
Robert G. Patterson, Member of the President of the Board of Agriculture's Food Production Dept. Advisory Committee
C. L. Paus, Commercial Attaché, His Britannic Majesty's Legation, Norway
Walter Payne, Section Director of Labour Regulation Dept., Ministry of Munitions
Ernest Alfred John Pearce, Assistant Director of Warship Production, Controller's Dept., Admiralty
Cmdr. Claud Pearce-Serocold  Naval Intelligence Division
Evelyn Pease, Commandant, Auxiliary Hospital, Richmond, North Yorkshire
Lucy Victoria Pease, Commandant, Auxiliary Hospital, Red Barns, North Yorkshire
Constance Dorothy Evelyn Peel, Joint Head of Women's Service Section in Food Economy Division, Ministry of Food
Alice Louisa Pendarves, Deputy President, Cornwall, British Red Cross and Order of St. John of Jerusalem
Emily Penrose, Principal of Somerville College, Oxford
William Gordon Perrin, Sec. to the Fifth Sea Lord, Admiralty
William Pettifor, Sec. to the Deputy Controller for Armament Production, Admiralty
Eng.-Cmdr. Arthur Edward Philip  Senior Chief Engineer, Canadian Pacific Ocean Services
Herbert Phillips, His Britannic Majesty's Consul, Shanghai
Owen Surtees Phillpotts, Commercial Attache, His Britannic Majesty's Legation, Sweden
Edith Picton-Turbervill, Director of Appeal, Munition Workers Welfare Committee, Y.W.C.A.
Mary Louisa Piercy, Organising Sec., Munitions Workers Welfare Committee, Y.W.C.A.
Albert John Pitcher, Architect, First Class, H.M. Office of Works
William Charles Platt, Assistant Clerk in Charge of Accounts, Home Office
Annie Constance, Lady Plumer, Lady Superintendent, Aldwych Y.M.C.A. Hut
Squadron-Cmdr. Charles Frederick Pollock, Royal Naval Air Service
Augustus Frank Pool, First Class Surveyor of Taxes, Inland Revenue
Herbert Porter, Section Director, Finance Dept., Ministry of Munitions
Charles James Procter  Y.M.C.A. Worker in Lancashire
Walter Byron Prosser, Clerk to the Kent County Council; Clerk to the West Kent Appeal Tribunal
William John Pulford, His Britannic Majesty's Consul, Tampico
Edward Joseph Rabbit, Naval Store Ofc., H.M. Dockyard, Rosyth
Francis Edward Raikes  Senior King's Foreign Messenger
Andrew Agnew Ralston, Chairman of Local Tribunal, Philpstoun, West Lothian
Lt.-Cmdr. James Randall  Naval Intelligence Division
Hugh Fraser Rankin, Sec. of the Butter and Cheese Advisory Committee and the Butter Import Committee, Ministry of Food
Capt. Joseph Barlow Ranson, Senior Capt., White Star Line
Constance Lilian Ratcliff, Commandant, Race Course Hospital, Cheltenham
Henry Stephenson Ratcliffe, Director of Trade Negotiations, Shipyard Labour Dept., Admiralty
Philip Bealby Reckitt  Organiser, Reckitt's Auxiliary Hospital, Hull
Frank William Reed, Director, Messrs. Craven Bros., Ltd., Stockport
William Reed, Shipyard Manager at Smith's Dock Company, Ltd. 
W. Maxwell Reekie, Second Ofc., Manchester Special Constabulary
James Daniel Rees, Senior Clerk, Exchequer and Audit Dept.
Lt. Maurice Ambrose Regan  Naval Transport Ofc., Hull; formerly Representative of Messrs. W. Mathwin and Son, Admiralty Coaling Agents at Hull
George Reid  Medical Ofc. of Health, Staffordshire County Council
William George Riddell, Partner of Messrs. Hastie and Company, Ltd., Greenock
Mary Stephanie Ridley, Vice-President, Wincanton District Somersetshire, British Red Cross and Order of St. John of Jerusalem
Edmond John Riley, Assistant Principal and Assistant Director of Army Contracts, War Office
Walter Lockhart Rind, Principal Clerk, Ministry of Pensions
Hugh Ritchie, Prize Court Dept., Foreign Office
Cmdr. Thomas Henry Roberts-Wray  Executive Ofc., Royal Navy, Depot, Crystal Palace
John Robertson  Medical Ofc. of Health, Birmingham
Lt.-Col. William Robertson  Recruiting Staff Ofc., Edinburgh
Edwin Robinson, Manager, Messrs. Vickers Ltd., Sheffield
Roy Lister Robinson, Superintending Forestry Inspector, Board of Agriculture
William Henry Robinson, Assistant in Financial Dept., Foreign Office
Alliott Verdon Roe
Capt. Tanner Montagu Rogers, Production Ofc., Aeroplane Supply Branch, Coventry District
Muriel Augusta Gillian Rogers, President of Radnor Branch, British Red Cross and Order of St. John of Jerusalem; Commandant of Auxiliary Hospital No. 2, Radnor
Noel Burn Rosher, Inspector of Munitions Areas, Birmingham
Hugh Henderson Ross, Finance Branch, Ministry of Shipping
Godfrey Rotter, Research Dept., Woolwich
Christopher Foulis Roundell, Inspector, Local Government Board
Amy Isabel, Lady Rowley, Vice-President of Guildford Division British Red Cross and Order of St. John of Jerusalem; Donor, Red Cross Annexe of Royal Surrey County Hospital. 
Frederick Henry Royce, Director and Chief Engineer, Rolls-Royce Ltd.
Frank William Ruddle, Chief Engineer, White Star Line
Norah Cecil Runge, Lady Superintendent, Free Buffet for Soldiers and Sailors, Paddington Station
Frederick Vernon Russell, Superintendent of Operations, Great Eastern Railway
John Russell  Vice-President of Burslem and Tunstall Division, and Assistant County Director for the North Staffordshire Area, British Red Cross and Order of St. John of Jerusalem
Annie Rutherford, Honorary Sec., North Riding of Yorkshire Branch, British Red Cross and Order of St. John of Jerusalem
George Rutherford Thomson, Provost of Arbroath; Chairman of Local Tribunal
John Ryan, Assistant Inspector of Dockyard Expense Accounts, Admiralty
Louise Victoria Samuel, War Refugees Committee
David Sandison, Provost of the Burgh of Wick
Bertram Edward Sargeaunt, Clerk of the Council and Government Sec. and Treasurer, Isle of Man
Frederick James Saunders 
District Stores Superintendent, Glasgow, Ministry of Munitions
Edwin Savill, Member of the President of the Board of Agriculture's Food Production Dept. Advisory Committee
Francis Ernest Saville, Chief Administration Ofc., Leeds Special Constabulary
Albert Edwin Sawday  Chairman of Leicester Local Tribunal
Sidney Scott, Collector of Customs and Excise, Glasgow
Cmdr. Thomas George Segrave, Royal Naval Reserve, Shipping Surveyor and Adviser, India Office
George Bertrand Sharpies, Engineer and Director of Messrs. C. J. Wills and Sons, Ltd.
Edward Burgess Sharpley, Town Clerk of Stoke-on-Trent; Clerk to the Local and Appeal Tribunal
Fleet-Paymaster Edward Haweis Shearme, Royal Navy, Assistant Chief Censor, Admiralty
Frank Sheppard, Lord Mayor of Bristol; Member of Bristol Local Tribunal
William Alfred Thomas Shorto, Sec., Auxiliary Shipbuilding Dept., Admiralty
Herbert John Simmonds, Sec. to the Advisory Committee to the Military Service'(Civil Liabilities) Committee
Col. Robert Henville Simonds  Sec., Dorset Territorial Force Association
Sophia Flora Skipwith, Commandant, Loversall Auxiliary Hospital, Doncaster
George Philip Skipworth, Assistant Commercial Attache, His Britannic Majesty's Legation, Switzerland
Alfred Smith, Managing Director, Messrs. Hattersley and Sons, Ltd., Kingsbury
Charles Smith, Principal Clerk, Pay Office
Ernest Wentworth Smith, Deputy Controller, Gauges Dept., Ministry of Munitions
Frank Edward Smith Superintendent, Electrical Dept., National Physical Laboratory
George Henry Cheverton Smith, Sec. and Cashier, H.M. Dockyard, Pembroke Dock
Herbert Smith  President of the Yorkshire Miners Association and Vice-President of the Miners Federation of Great Britain
John Arthur Smith, Accountant-General's Dept., Admiralty
Capt. Rowland Siddons Smith, Translator to His Britannic Majesty's Embassy, Petrograd
Thomas Blampey Smith, Manager, Coventry Ordnance Works, Ltd., Coventry
William Sydney Smith Inspector of Factories (Dangerous Trades)
Florence Mary Snowden, Organising Sec., Voluntary Helpers, Munition Workers Canteen Committee, Y.W.C.A.
F. N. Southam, Director, 60-pounder and 4.5 H.E. Shell Production, Imperial Munitions Board, Canada
Charles Joseph Southgate Accountant-General's Dept., Admiralty
Mary Gertrude Catherine Hitchcock Spencer, Central Women's Employment Bureau for the Relief of the Professional Classes
Rose Elizabeth Squire, Deputy Principal Lady Inspector of Factories
Alfred Edward Staniland  Chairman of the Spilsby Local Emergency Committee, Lincolnshire
Frank Robert Stapley, Section Director, Contracts Branch, Air Board
Charles Stein  Commandant and Medical Ofc., Park House Auxiliary Hospital, Shipston-on-Stour, Warwickshire
Maj. Charles Hubert Stemp, Operating Superintendent, North British Railway
George Routledge Stenson, Superintending Inspector of Taxes
Richard Henry Stephenson, Manager, Messrs. Smith's Dock Company, Ltd., North and South Shields
Frederick Stevens, Town Clerk of Bradford; Clerk to the Bradford Local Tribunal
Ida Kathleen Stevens, Area Controller, Woman's Army Auxiliary Corps
Patrick William Joseph Stevens, His Majesty's Consul, Batoum
May Margaret Stevenson, Unit Administrator, Woman's Army Auxiliary Corps
William March Stevenson, Financial Expert Adviser to the Finance Section, Ministry of Blockade
Alice Margaret Stewart, President Depute, Lanarkshire, Scottish Branch, British Red Cross Society
Athole Stewart, Telegram Dept., Foreign Office
James Stewart, Works Manager, The Caton Engineering Company's Torpedo Factory
William Allison Stewart, Commercial Services Branch, Ministry of Shipping 
Rufus Stirk, Director, Messrs. John Stirk & Sons, Ltd., Halifax
Cmdr. Thomas Willing Stirling, Royal Navy, Operations Division, Admiralty
Frederick William Stobart, George William Stonestreet, Inspector of Stamping, Inland Revenue
Maj. Harry Vane Stow  Sec. of the Newspapers for the Fleet Committee, London Chamber of Commerce
Henrietta Mary Amy Strachey, Vice-President of Division and Commandant of Newlands Corner Auxiliary Hospital, Merrow Downs, Guildford, Surrey
Evelyn Olive Streatfeild, Commandant, Hammerton House Auxiliary Hospital, Sunderland
Mary Corisande Streatfeild, Donor and Administrator, Ofc.s Hospital, 24, Park Street, Mayfair, London
Emily Mary Charlotte Strutt, Commandant, Auxiliary Hospital, Belper, Derbyshire
George Stubbs  Superintending Analyst, Government Laboratory
George Edward Suter  Manager, Constructive Dept., H.M. Dockyard, Rosyth
Percival Francis Swain, Principal Clerk, Public Trustee Office
William Henry Swain, Senior Clerk, Military Dept., India Office
George Percy Tallboy, Private Sec. to the Permanent Sec., Ministry of Food
Arthur Enfield Taylor, Head of Establishment Branch, Explosives Supply Dept., Ministry of Munitions
Capt. David Taylor, Master, Donaldson Line
George Stevenson Taylor, Deputy Inspector under the Aliens Act
John Taylor, Manager, Messrs. Mather and Platt, Ltd., Manchester
Richard Henry Taylor, Of the Firm, of Messrs. Topham, Jones and Railton, Ltd.
Capt. Thomas McComb Taylor, Royal Naval Reserve, Master, Pacific Steam Navigation Company
Capt. Louis George Tebbs, District Stores Superintendent, London, Ministry of Munitions
Alfred Edward Tedder, Superintending Aliens Ofc.
Ivy Gladys Tennyson, Head of Women's Establishment Branch, Ministry of Munitions
David John Thomas, Manager and Sec., Llanelly Munitions Board of Management
Edgar William Thomas, Financial Adviser to the Public Trustee
Capt. John Thomas
Lillie Thomas, Donor and Commandant, Auxiliary Hospital, Dinas Powis, Glamorgan
Walter John Thomas, Managing Director, Messrs. George Driver and Son, London
Mary Thompson, Commandant, Auxiliary Hospital, Burton-on-Trent, Staffordshire
Robert John Thompson, Head of Fertilisers Section, Food Production Dept.
Margaret Edith Thomson, Commandant, Divisional Auxiliary Hospital, Ampthill Road Schools, Bedford
William Thomas Thomson, Manager, Royal Naval Cordite Factory, Holton Heath
Daisy Thornely, Commandant, Auxiliary Hospital, Devizes
William Thornton, Clerk, Munitions Tribunal, Leeds
Duncan Todd, Sec., Reserved Occupations Committee
Joseph Henry Towsey, His Britannic Majesty's Consul, Milan
Herbert Arthur Previte Trendell  Chief Clerk of the Central Chancery of Orders of Knighthood
George Harry Male Trew, Acting Superintending Civil Engineer, H.M. Dockyard, Invergordon
The Hon. Stella Tufton, Lady Superintendent, Alexandra Y.M.C.A. Hostel for Ofc.s
Capt. William Thomas Turner, Cunard Steamship Co., Ltd.
Armigill Thomas Turpin, Assistant Comptroller of Accounts and Stores, Prisor Commission
George Frederick Tweedy, Engineering Director, Messrs. Swan, Hunter and Wighain Richardson, Ltd.
Walter Clifford Tyndale
Hugh Harman Underbill, Assistant Superintendent of Charts, Hydrographic Dept., Admiralty
Harry Archbutt Venables  Principal Clerk, Ministry of Pensions
James William Verdier, Superintendent of Staff, Census of Production, Board of Trade
Percy Venables Vernon, Section Director, Machine Tool Dept., Ministry of Munitions
David Arthur Fitzgerald Vesey, Legal Draftsman, Contracts Dept., Ministry of Munitions
Harry Walker, Messrs. Clark, Chapman & Company, Ltd., Gateshead-on-Tyne
Falconer Lewis Wallace, Commission Internationale de Ravitaillement, Board of Trade
William Reeve Wallace, Chief Clerk, Judicial Dept., Privy Council Office
Cecil Walton  Manager, Cardonald National Projectile Factory, Ministry of Munitions
Thomas Warburton, Director of the Bleachers Association, Ltd.
Leonard Ward, Late Superintending Engineer, Ministry of Munitions, No. 4 Area (Midlands)
Henry Brooks Warner, Prisoners of War Dept., Foreign Office
Robert A. S. Waters, Manager, Messrs. Sir W. G. Armstrong, Whitworth & Company, Ltd., York
Arthur William Watson, Deputy Assistant Sec., Establishment Branch, Whitehall Gardens, Ministry of Munitions
Henry Watson, Messrs. H. Watson & Sons, Newcastle upon Tyne
Isaac Adolphus Herbert Watson, Superintendent of Stores & Transit, H.M. Stationery Office
William Elder Watson  Member of Appeal Tribunal, Elgin
Edgar Charles Watts, Naval Store Ofc., H.M. Dockyard, Chatham
Henry Weatherill, Principal Clerk and Actuary to the National Debt Comm.s
Frederick William Herron Weaver, Ministry of Shipping
Cecil Dunstan Webb, Procurator-General's Dept.
Amherst Webber, Director, Passport Control Office, Paris
William Goold Weir, Partner of Messrs. David Rowan & Company, Glasgow
Thomas George Raymond Wells, War Office Meat Expert
Basil Eliot Wenham, Section Director, Raw Materials Dept., Ministry of Munitions
Edmund Arthur Robert Werner, Inspector of Factories
Capt. John Andrew Chilton Wetherall, Sec., Northampton Territorial Force Association
Charles Joseph Wharton, Deputy Director of Inspection, Munitions Areas, Sheffield
Lt.-Col. William Henry Anthony Wharton 
Arthur Rabbitts White  Chairman, Wiltshire War Agricultural Executive Committee
Frederick White, Sec. of the Australasian Refrigerated Tonnage Committee
Frederick Wickham, Controller, Money Order Dept., General Post Office
Cmdr. Edmund Wildy  Drafting Cmdr., Royal Navy, Dept., Crystal Palace
Lt. Norman Wilkinson 
Frank Eliot Williams, Chairman of one of the Licensing Committees of the War Trade Dept.
Maj. Ronald Frederick Williams, Assistant Director, Shipyard Labour Dept., Admiralty
Arthur Maitland Wilson  Chairman of the Organising Emergency Committee, West Suffolk
Geraldine Wilson, Commandant, Auxiliary Hospital, Stanwick Park, North Yorkshire
George Gordon Wilson, His Britannic Majesty's Consul, Callao
George Heron Wilson, Assistant Controller, Priority Dept., Ministry of Munitions
Harry James Wilson, Superintending Inspector of Factories
Hubert Wilberforce Wilson, His Britannic Majesty's Consul, Guayaquil
Thomas Wilson  Member of Lanarkshire Appeal Tribunal
Lt.-Cmdr. Harry Egerton Wimperis 
William Humphris Winny, A Knight of Grace and Deputy Comm. of the Order of St. John of Jerusalem
James Wood, Chief Inspector, Board of Agriculture for Scotland
James Wood, Director of Shrapnel Production, Imperial Munitions Board, Canada
Joseph Woods  Senior Dental Surgeon, Mirren, Switzerland
William James Uglow Woolcock, Sec., Pharmaceutical Society; Assistant Director of Army Contracts
Frank Vigers Worthington, Deputy Chief Censor, War Office
Anthony Andrew Augustine Wotzel, Chief Staff Ofc., Labour Statistics Dept., Ministry of Labour
Charles Francis Wright, Superintending Inspector of Factories
Hugh Copner Wynne-Edwards, Section Director, Contracts Dept., Ministry of Munitions
Aline Wythes, Vice-President, Epping Division, British Red Cress and Order of St. John of Jerusalem; Commandant of Theydon Towers Auxiliary Hospital, Epping, Essex
Sophia Bruce Yeoman, Commandant, Auxiliary Hospital, Sleights, North Yorkshire
Frederick William Young, Naval Salvage Adviser
James Young, Senior Instructor in Science, Royal Military Academy
Robert Hellyer Young, Ministry of Shipping
Sidney Young, Managing Director of the British Argentine Meat Company

For services in connection with the War in France, Egypt and Salonika —
William Austin, Young Men's Christian Association Sec. for the 1st and 3rd Armies
Alice Chisholm, Organiser and Superintendent of the Soldiers' Club and Rest Camp, Kantara Railway Station, Egypt
Isabel Currie, Founder and Manager of the British Soldiers' Club, Havre
Richard Hare Duke, Deputy Chief Engineer, Egyptian State Railways
George Herbert Griffith, Traffic Superintendent, Egyptian State Railways
William Jessop, Manager, Young Men's Christian Association, Egypt
Charles John Magrath  Superintendent, Young Men's Christian Association, France
Sydney H. Wells, Director-General of Technical Education, Egypt

British India
Constance Fraser, President, Hyderabad Ladies War Relief Association
Lt.-Col. Arthur Leslie Jacob  Indian Army, Political Dept., Political Agent, Zhob, Baluchistan
Maj. Arthur Dennys Gilbert Ramsay  Indian Army, Political Dept., Political Agent, Loralai, Baluchistan
Lt.-Col. Henry Batten Huddleston, Agent, Burma Railways, Honorary Aide-de-Camp to the Lieutenant-Governor of Burma, Vice-Chairman, Rangoon Port Trust
David Petrie  Indian Police
Godfrey Charles Denham  Indian Police
Cowasji Jehangir, Merchant, Bombay
Sarat Kumar Mullick  Honorary Sec., Bengalee Reg. Committee, Private Medical Practitioner, Calcutta
Thomas Steel Downie, Sec., Karachi Port Trust
Arthur Alexander Carnegie, Cmdr. of the Cable Steamer Patrick Stewart
Edward John Buck, Honorary Sec. of "Our Day" in India

Commonwealth of Australia
Elizabeth Anderson, for services in Australia in connection with the Australian Branch of the British Red Cross Society
Percy Arnold, for services in connection with the Australian Branch of the British Red Cross Society in England
Doctor Edith Helen Barrett, Honorary Sec., Australian Branch of the British Red Cross Society
Charles Austin Bunworth Campion, for services in connection with the Australian Branch of the British Red Cross Society in England
Mary Elizabeth Maud Chomley, for services in connection with the Australian Branch of the British' Red Cross Society in England
Adelaide, Lady Creswell, for services in Australia in connection with the Australian Branch of the British Red Cross Society
Vera Deakin, for services in connection with the Australian Branch of the British Red Cross Society in England
James Oswald Fairfax, Chairman of the New South Wales Division, Australian Branch, British Red Cross Society
Jeannie Gilruth, for services in Australia in connection with the Australian Branch of the British Red Cross Society
Lt.-Col. Edwyn Walton Hayward, Comm., Australian Red Cross Society
Gwyneforde, Lady James, for services in Australia in connection with the Australian Branch of the British Red Cross Society
A. E. Miller, for services in Australia in connection with the Australian Branch of the British Red Cross Society
Mary Elizabeth, Lady Miller, for services in Australia in connection with the Australian Branch of the British Red Cross Society
Gladys Owen, for services in Australia in connection with the Australian Branch of the British Red Cross Society
F. Mary Parker, Honorary Sec., Southern Tasmanian Division, Australian Red Cross
Philadelphia Nina Robertson, Sec., Australian Branch of the British Red Cross Society
Kathleen Kyffin Thomas, for services in Australia in connection with the Australian Branch of the British Red Cross Society
Herbert Carey Tucker, Initiator of the Button Scheme
Reginald Edward Weigall  Organiser of motor service for the reception of returned and wounded soldiers

Egypt and the Sudan
Arthur Thomas Lloyd, War Trade Dept.
James Francis Gordon Hopkins, Chief Inspector, Ministry of Finance
Arthur Ferguson MacCallan  Director of Ophthalmic Hospitals
Albert William Hazel, Inspector of Interior
Edward Harry Grogan, Chief Inspector of Marine, Ports and Lights Administration
Lindsay Edward Bury, Inspector of Irrigation
Frank Pears Watson, Inspector of State Buildings, Dept. of Public Works
Harold Preece Hewins, Sec. of Sudan Economic Board
George Ehret Iles, Governor of Blue Nile Province
Clement Gaukroger Hodgson, Chief Mechanical Engineer, Sudan Railways
William Crothers Hornblower, Organiser of the Refugee Camps at Alexandria and Port Said
Norman Macnaghten, Inspector, Ministry of Interior

Dominion of New Zealand
Fanny Boyle
Heni Materoa, Lady Carroll
James John Clark, Mayor of the City of Dunedin
Lavinia Coates
David Whamond Duthie
James Henry Gunson, Mayor of the City of Auckland
Jessie Gunson
Henry Holland, Mayor of the City of Christchurch
Jane Holland
Helen Lowry
Miria Woodbine Pomare
Arthur Edgar Gravenor Rhodes
Eva Lydia Rutherford
Mary Downie Stewart
Agnes Vernon Wigram
Hilda Williams, for services in connection with the Hospitality Committee of the New Zealand War Contingent Association

Union of South Africa
Theodora Mildred Amphlett, Honorary Sec., South African Comforts Committee in London
Norman Anstey, late Mayor of Johannesburg 
Reginald Andrew Blankenberg, Assistant Sec. to the High Comm. in London for the Union of South Africa
The Hon. Albert Browne  Joint Honorary Sec., Governor-General's Fund
The Hon. Phyllis Sydney Buxton, for Hospital and Convalescent work
Penelope Louise Chappe, of the Red Cross Committee, Durban
Gowan Cresswell Strange Clark  Assistant General Manager, South African Railways
Mary Elizabeth Davis, of the Women's Patriotic.League, Pietermaritzburg
Walter Greenacre, of the Governor-General's Fund and other Committees, Durban
Helen Lena, Lady Juta
Elizabeth Tryphena Lewis, of the Comforts Committee, Cape Town
Ellen Maria Louisa Mackeurtan, of the Women's Patriotic League, Durban
Susannah Brandt Marx, of the Comforts Committee, Johannesburg
Joseph Henry Nicolson, Mayor of Durban
John Wesley O'Hara, late Mayor of Johannesburg
John Parker, late Mayor of Cape Town
Henry William Sampson, Member of the Executive Committee, Governor-General's Fund
Sybil Annie, Lady Smartt, of the Red Cross and other War Fund Committees
Maud Elizabeth, Lady Solomon
Col. The Hon. Walter Ernest Mortimer Stanford  Chairman, Recruiting Committee, Cape Town
Maj. Edward Albert Sturman, Honorary Sec., South African Gifts and Comforts Committee
John Taylor, Chairman, Johannesburg Local Committee of the Governor-General's Fund
Carel Johannes van Zijl, for services in connection with recruiting

Newfoundland
Adeline Elizabeth Browning, for services in connection with the reception and treatment of returned sailors and soldiers
Charles O'Neill Conroy  Commandant of the Catholic Cadet Corps
Katharine Emerson, Treasurer of the Women's Patriotic Association
Walter Baine Grieve, Honorary Sec. of the Recruiting Committee
Eleonora Thompson MacPherson, Member of the Executive of the Women's Patriotic Association
Florence Lavinia Paterson, Member of the Committee for receiving returned soldiers
Robert George Rendell, Organiser of the Cadet Corps

Crown Colonies, Protectorates, etc. 
Chaloner Grenville Alabaster, for services in connection with the Cable Censorate, Hong Kong
John Humber Allwood, for services to the Government of Jamaica and to War charities
Capt. James Leo Berne, District Comm., Somaliland Protectorate, for services in connection with the supply of camels for the Egyptian Expeditionary Force
Amy Isabel, Lady Bullock, for services in aid of War charities in the Bermuda Islands
Albert Ruskin Cook  Medical Ofc., Church Missionary Society Hospital, Kampala, Uganda
Lt.-Col. James Cran, Commanding the British Honduras Territorial Force
Anthony de Freitas, Chief Justice and Acting Administrator of the Island of St. Vincent
Gertrude Drayton, Sec., King George and Queen Mary Victoria League Clubs for men of the Oversea Forces
Ada Maud, Lady Egerton; for services to War and other charities in British Guiana
Muriel Harriet Felton; for services rendered to the British Squadron on the occasion of the Naval Battle of the Falkland Islands, 8 December 1914
John Campbell Fisher, Auditor, and Head of the Food Control Office, Malta
Stanley Hewitt Fletcher, late-Consul at Chinde, and Agent there of the Nyasaland Government
John Talfourd Furley, Sec. for Native Affairs, Gold Coast Colony
The Hon. Evelyn Graham Murray, Lady Superintendent of Peel House, King George and Queen Mary's Club for the Oversea Forces
George Frederick Huggins, for services in connection with recruiting and in securing employment for discharged soldiers, Trinidad
Edward St. John Jackson, Legal Adviser, Colony of the Gambia
Williard Frank James, Mayor of Blantyre, and Chairman of the Central War Funds Committee, Nyasaland Protectorate
Robert Russell Horsley Jebb, Assistant District Comm., Somaliland Protectorate; for services in connection with the supply of camels for the Egyptian Expeditionary Force
Margaret Emmeline Johnston, President of the Working League, Gibraltar
Lim Boon Keng, Unofficial Member of the Legislative Council of the Straits Settlements
Harcourt Malcolm  Speaker of the House of Assembly of the Bahamas Islands, and Chairman of the Bahamas' War Relief Committee
James Gordon McDonald, Chairman of the Rhodesia Munitions Committee
Sybil Helen Nicholson, for services on behalf of sailors and soldiers in the Straits Settlements
Edward Hugh Dyneley Nicolls, Director of Public Works, Cyprus
Joseph Armand Patron  for services to the Government of Gibraltar
Emily, Lady Probyn, for services to War Charities in Barbados
Cecily Radcliffe, for services to War Charities and to sick and wounded sailors and soldiers, Malta
Beatrice Letitia May Radford, Sec. and Organiser of the East African Women's Field Force Fund
Joseph Rippon, Manager of the Direct West India Cable Company, and Chairman of the Bermuda Contingents Committee
Corinna, Marchesa Scicluna; for services in providing and equipping a Military Hospital in Malta
Ernest Hamilton Sharp, Chairman of the Military Commission, Hong Kong
Hubert Ashton Laselve Simpson, elected Member of the Legislative Council, and lately Mayor of Kingston
Jamaica
Stanley Salisbury Spurling, Member of the Executive Council and of the House of Assembly of the Bermudas
Newton John Stabb, Chief Manager, Hong Kong and Shanghai Banking Corporation, Hong Kong
Maj. Charles Augustus Swinbourne, Commandant of the Fiji Defence Force
William Wilson, of Kingston, Jamaica; for services in recruiting and on behalf of sick and wounded soldiers

Honorary Ofc. of the said Most Excellent Order

The Right Reverend Philippe Perlo, for assistance in providing priests and nuns for the work in the Carrier Corps Hospitals, in connection with the East Africa Expeditionary Force.

References

New Year Honours
1918 awards
1918 in Australia
1918 in Canada
1918 in India
1918 in New Zealand
1918 in the United Kingdom